Brian Clayton (born 18 August 1948) is a South African former cricketer. He played in five first-class matches for Eastern Province in 1977/78.

See also
 List of Eastern Province representative cricketers

References

External links
 

1948 births
Living people
South African cricketers
Eastern Province cricketers
People from Makhanda, Eastern Cape
Cricketers from the Eastern Cape